Polanowice  is a village in the administrative district of Gmina Gubin, within Krosno Odrzańskie County, Lubusz Voivodeship, in western Poland, close to the German border.

The burgward of Niempsi was first mentioned in a deed of donation issued by Emperor Otto III in 1000 AD, when it passed to the estates of Nienburg Abbey. Therefore, one of the oldest settlements in Lower Lusatia, the former Slavic gord may already had been part of the vast Marca Geronis, near the eastern border with the medieval Kingdom of Poland. Temporarily conquered by the Polish ruler Bolesław Chrobry, it returned to the Imperial March of Lusatia by 1032.

Before the implementation of the Oder–Neisse line in 1945 the area was part of Germany (see Territorial changes of Poland after World War II).

References

Polanowice